Ant spiders are members of the family Zodariidae. They are small to medium-sized eight-eyed spiders found in all tropical and subtropical regions of South America, Africa, Madagascar, Australia-New Guinea, New Zealand, Arabia and the Indian subcontinent. Most species are daytime hunters and live together with ants, mimicking their behavior and sometimes even their chemical traits. Although little is known about most zodariids, members of the genus Zodarion apparently feed only on ants; a number of other genera in the family are apparently also ant (or termite) specialists.

Genera
, the World Spider Catalog accepted the following genera:

Acanthinozodium Denis, 1966
Akyttara Jocqué, 1987
Amphiledorus Jocqué & Bosmans, 2001
Antillorena Jocqué, 1991
Asceua Thorell, 1887
Aschema Jocqué, 1991
Asteron Jocqué, 1991
Australutica Jocqué, 1995
Ballomma Jocqué & Henrard, 2015
Basasteron Baehr, 2003
Caesetius Simon, 1893
Cambonilla Jocqué, 2019
Capheris Simon, 1893
Cavasteron Baehr & Jocqué, 2000
Chariobas Simon, 1893
Chilumena Jocqué, 1995
Cicynethus Simon, 1910
Colima Jocqué & Baert, 2005
Cryptothele L. Koch, 1872
Cybaeodamus Mello-Leitão, 1938
Cydrela Thorell, 1873
Cyrioctea Simon, 1889
Diores Simon, 1893
Dusmadiores Jocqué, 1987
Epicratinus Jocqué & Baert, 2005
Euasteron Baehr, 2003
Euryeidon Dankittipakul & Jocqué, 2004
Forsterella Jocqué, 1991
Habronestes L. Koch, 1872
Heliconilla Dankittipakul, Jocqué & Singtripop, 2012
Heradida Simon, 1893
Heradion Dankittipakul & Jocqué, 2004
Hermippus Simon, 1893
Hetaerica Rainbow, 1916
Holasteron Baehr, 2004
Indozodion Ovtchinnikov, 2006
Ishania Chamberlin, 1925
Lachesana Strand, 1932
Laminion Sankaran, Caleb & Sebastian, 2020
Leprolochus Simon, 1893
Leptasteron Baehr & Jocqué, 2001
Leviola Miller, 1970
Lutica Marx, 1891
Malayozodarion Ono & Hashim, 2008
Mallinella Strand, 1906
Mallinus Simon, 1893
Masasteron Baehr, 2004
Mastidiores Jocqué, 1987
Microdiores Jocqué, 1987
Minasteron Baehr & Jocqué, 2000
Murphydrela Jocqué & Russell-Smith, 2022
Neostorena Rainbow, 1914
Nostera Jocqué, 1991
Nosterella Baehr & Jocqué, 2017
Notasteron Baehr, 2005
Omucukia Koçak & Kemal, 2008
Palaestina O. Pickard-Cambridge, 1872
Palfuria Simon, 1910
Palindroma Jocqué & Henrard, 2015
Parazodarion Ovtchinnikov, Ahmad & Gurko, 2009
Pax Levy, 1990
Pentasteron Baehr & Jocqué, 2001
Phenasteron Baehr & Jocqué, 2001
Platnickia Jocqué, 1991
Procydrela Jocqué, 1999
Psammoduon Jocqué, 1991
Psammorygma Jocqué, 1991
Pseudasteron Jocqué & Baehr, 2001
Ranops Jocqué, 1991
Rotundrela Jocqué, 1999
Selamia Simon, 1873
Spinasteron Baehr, 2003
Spinozodium Zamani & Marusik, 2022
Storena Walckenaer, 1805
Storenomorpha Simon, 1884
Storosa Jocqué, 1991
Subasteron Baehr & Jocqué, 2001
Suffascar Henrard & Jocqué, 2017
Suffasia Jocqué, 1991
Suffrica Henrard & Jocqué, 2015
Systenoplacis Simon, 1907
Tenedos O. Pickard-Cambridge, 1897
Thaumastochilus Simon, 1897
Tropasteron Baehr, 2003
Tropizodium Jocqué & Churchill, 2005
Trygetus Simon, 1882
Workmania Dankittipakul, Jocqué & Singtripop, 2012
Zillimata Jocqué, 1995
Zodariellum Andreeva & Tyschchenko, 1968
Zodarion Walckenaer, 1826

See also
 List of Zodariidae species
 Myrmarachne, a genus of ant-mimicking spiders in the family Salticidae

References